Estefania Souza  (born ) is a retired Brazilian female volleyball player.

She was part of the Brazil women's national volleyball team at the 1994 FIVB Volleyball Women's World Championship in Brazil. On club level she played with Nossa CaiaIRecreativa.

Clubs
 Nossa CaiaIRecreativa (1994)

References

1972 births
Living people
Brazilian women's volleyball players
Place of birth missing (living people)